Rakesh Sethi (Hindi:राकेश सेठी ) is the former Chairman and Managing Director of Allahabad Bank. Prior to this, Sethi was an executive director at Punjab National Bank. He joined Allahabad Bank in March, 2014 and will serve until 2017. He was preceded by Shubalakshmi Panse.

Background
He started his banking career from Andhra Bank as an Officer in 1978. Rakesh Sethi in his 34 years of experience served as a National Banking Group General Manager at Bank of India, General Manager of Andhra Bank, Director of Andhra Bank (since 26 December 2008).

Rakesh Sethi was also the Chairman of the Board at JSC Subsidiary Bank Punjab National Bank Kazakhstan since 6 April 2012, An Executive Director of Union Bank of India since August 2013. He serves as a Nominee Director of India Factoring and Finance Solutions Pvt. Ltd. He served as an Executive Director of Punjab National Bank from 1 January 2011 to 11 March 2014. He served as a Non-Executive Director of PNB Gilts Ltd. from 24 October 2011 to 9 January 2013.

References

Year of birth missing (living people)
Place of birth missing (living people)
Living people
Indian bankers
Indian chairpersons of corporations
Osmania University alumni